Luci Murphy is an American singer, political activist, community organizer, and language interpreter. Since the 1960s, she has been performing political songs in musical styles such as jazz and blues. In 1987, she performed in Germany in the Festival of Political Songs.

Music 
Luci Murphy sings in the genres of jazz and blues.  She has performed in Cuba, China, Brazil and Palestinian camps in Lebanon. She often encourages her audience to join in to sing. Within the jazz opera Love Songs From the Liberation Wars, she sings the recitative part of the opera in which the pain and anguish of one of the African-American factory women living in the Jim Crow era is emphasized.

Political activism 
She has given support to the Civil Rights Movement, the anti-war movement, the anti-apartheid movement, anti-police brutality movement, pro-labor union rights movement, the Puerto Rican independence movement, the Palestinian liberation, the Cuban revolution, the Venezuelan Bolivarian revolution. The topics of her songs include civil rights, the end of white supremacy, affordable housing, food security, union rights, peace, and Palestine and Latin American self-determination, among other causes. Within her songs, she has spoken against US police brutality, Palestinian and Colombian population displacement, and the Cuban blockade.

Major performances

References

External links
As Protests Grow, Luci Murphy & The People's Music Network Ensure There Are Songs to Go With Them

Living people
Date of birth missing (living people)
American political activists
21st-century African-American women singers
American community activists
Jazz-blues musicians
American civil rights activists
American anti-war activists
Year of birth missing (living people)